Flower Pot Men is a British programme for young children produced by BBC Television. It was first transmitted in 1952, and repeated regularly for more than twenty years. A reboot of the show called Bill and Ben was produced in 2001.

Production
The original programme was part of a BBC children's television series titled Watch with Mother, featuring a different programme each weekday, most of them involving string puppets. The Flower Pot Men was the story of Bill and Ben, two little men made of flower pots who lived at the bottom of an English suburban garden. The characters were devised by Freda Lingstrom and Maria Bird in the 1950s. The puppeteers were Audrey Atterbury and Molly Gibson. The voices and other noises were produced by Peter Hawkins, Gladys Whitred, and Julia Williams who was the voice of Little Weed. The narration in all of the 1950s original episodes was by Maria Bird.

The plot changed little over the run and always took place in a garden, behind a potting shed. A third character, Little Weed, of indeterminate species resembling either a sunflower or a dandelion with a smiling face, was shown growing between two large flowerpots. The three were also sometimes visited by a tortoise called Slowcoach and, in one particular episode, the trio met a faintly mysterious character made out of potatoes, Dan the potato man. Typically, while the "man who worked in the garden" would be away having his dinner, the two Flower Pot Men, Bill and Ben, would emerge from their pots. After a minor adventure, a slight mishap would occur, for which someone would then take the blame: "Which of these two flowerpot men, was it Bill or was it Ben?" the narrator would trill in a quavering soprano; the culprit would then confess, before the gardener's footsteps would be heard coming up the garden path; the Flower Pot Men then would vanish into their pots and the "Goodbye" screen would appear. The final punch-line was, "..and I think the little house knew something about it; don't you?".

The Flower Pot Men spoke their own, highly inflected version of English, called Oddle Poddle, invented by prolific voice artist Peter Hawkins (who later provided speech for Captain Pugwash and the Daleks in Doctor Who). "Ickle-kickle", for instance, was an icicle and Ben would say "Flobabdob!". At the end of each adventure, they would say bye-bye to each other and to the Little Weed – "Babap, Ickle Weed!" – to which the Weed would inevitably reply, with tremulous cadence, "Weeeeeeeeeeed!". This language, as with the Teletubbies series in 1997, was criticised for hindering children from learning proper English.

Due to the series being made on film and repeated regularly for years following its conclusion, all episodes are believed to survive intact, with none missing from the BBC Archives.

Episodes

UK VHS and DVD releases

Confusion with other characters 
The programme is unrelated to another set of characters called Bill and Ben, which have been confused with the Flower Pot Men, including in the initial versions of two obituaries of retired headteacher Hilda Brabban, published in The Independent and BBC's in-house magazine Ariel respectively, and also in Bills, a 2004 episode of the BBC panel show QI hosted by Stephen Fry. All three sources later corrected their statements. Brabban sold three stories about a Bill and Ben to the BBC in the 1950's; but other than their names, they bore no resemblance to the Flower Pot Men. Brabban's stories were broadcast on the radio programme Listen with Mother in 1951; the Bill and Ben of the Flower Pot Men were first seen on the television programme Watch with Mother in 1952. Both programmes were produced by Freda Lingstrom. During her later life Brabban suffered a stroke and later maintained she did invent the characters used in the BBC series; this prompted lawyers, acting on behalf of the estate of the show's creator, Freda Lingstrom, to threaten Brabban with litigation if she appeared on television to propagate this claim.

Comics
The show was the basis for a comic strip of the same name in the children's magazine Robin.

References

External links
 
 Toonhound on the Flowerpot Men
 Whirligig TV
 

1950s British children's television series
1952 British television series debuts
BBC children's television shows
British preschool education television series
British stop-motion animated television series
British television series revived after cancellation
British television shows featuring puppetry
English-language television shows
Television shows adapted into comics
Television series by BBC Studios